Novonikolayevka is a rural locality (a village) in Nizhneulu-Yelginsky Selsoviet, Yermekeyevsky District, Bashkortostan, Russia. The population was 74 as of 2010. There are 2 streets.

Geography 
Novonikolayevka is located 4 km southeast of Yermekeyevo (the district's administrative centre) by road. Nizhneulu-Yelga is the nearest rural locality.

References 

Rural localities in Yermekeyevsky District